Sukleji River is a river in Balochistan Province, in southwestern Pakistan.

Sukleji Dam
Sukleji Dam is a proposed dam located across Sukleji River in the Kachhi District of Balochistan.

See also
Rivers of Balochistan
Geography of Balochistan, Pakistan

Notes

Rivers of Balochistan (Pakistan)
Kachhi District
Rivers of Pakistan